Until the End is the second studio album by the Swedish symphonic metal band Eleine. The album featured five singles, in the form of three music videos for the tracks "Hell Moon (We Shall Never Die)", "Break Take Live" and "Echoes", and two lyric videos for "Sanity" and "Whisper My Child". The album peaked at number 22 on the Swedish album charts.

Track listing
All songs are written by Eleine.

 "Story Untold" – 5:05
 "Echoes" – 4:06
 "Sanity" – 3:59
 "From the Grave" – 4:13
 "Whisper My Child" – 3:54
 "Until the End" – 4:51
 "Please" – 4:02
 "Another Rite" – 4:05
 "Hell Moon (We Shall Never Die)" – 4:30
 "Prelude: Arise (Instrumental)" – 0:41
 "Break Take Live" – 3:56

Bonus track (Japanese version, Avalon Records MICP-11412)
<li>"Story Untold" (symphonic version) – 5:01

Personnel
Credits adapted from the album's liner notes.
 Madeleine "Eleine" Liljestam – vocals
 Rikard Ekberg – guitar, growl, vocals
 Andreas Mårtensson – bass
 David Eriksson – drums
 Sebastian Berglund – keyboards

Production
 Produced by Eleine
 Mixed and co-recorded by Erik Wiss at Wiss Music Production and Eleine
 Mastered at The Panic Room

Charts

References

2018 albums